Muhammad Ajmal Khan was a Pakistani botanist and the 17th Vice-Chancellor of University of Karachi.

Education and career
Khan spent 40 years in teaching and research. He received his BSc (Hons) degree in botany in 1973, MSc in plant physiology in 1974 from University of Karachi, PhD in physiological ecology from Ohio University in 1985 and DSc in botany again from University of Karachi in 2010.

Awards and honors
 Presidential Award of Sitara-e-Imtiaz
 Fellow, Pakistan Academy of Sciences
 Presidential Award of Pride of Performance

References

2019 deaths
Pakistani botanists
University of Karachi alumni
Vice-Chancellors of the University of Karachi
Recipients of Sitara-i-Imtiaz
Recipients of the Pride of Performance
Ohio University alumni
Year of birth missing